Caio Paduan (born 5 December 1986) is a Brazilian actor.

Career
In 2011, he was the protagonist of the nineteenth season of Malhação, where he made a romantic pair initially with Thaís Melchior and then with Bia Arantes.

In 2015 he joined the cast of the novel Além do Tempo, where he played the romantic Afonso. The following year, Caio joined the cast of the novel Rock Story, playing the villain Alex. In 2017 he entered the cast of O Outro Lado do Paraíso. Currently plays playboy Quinzinho in the novel of the 7 Verão 90.

Filmography

Television

Cinema

Awards and nominations

References

External links

1986 births
Living people
Male actors from Rio de Janeiro (city)
Brazilian male telenovela actors
Brazilian male film actors